Bibasis sena, commonly known as the orange-tailed awlet, is a butterfly belonging to the family Hesperiidae, the skippers. It is also sometimes called the pale green awlet though that name can also refer to Bibasis gomata.

Distribution
This skipper is found in Sri Lanka, India, Myanmar, Cambodia, Thailand, Laos, south Vietnam, Hainan, Malay peninsula, Indonesian archipelago (including Borneo, Java, Kangean, Bali, Lombok, Bawean, Sumba, Sumbawa) and the Philippines.

In India, this skipper is found in the Western Ghats including the Nilgiris, Kodagu, Kanara, and the Himalayas, from Shimla eastward to Northeast India and onto Myanmar (recorded in the Karens and Dawnas). Also found in Andaman and Nicobar Islands.

The type locality for this species is the region of Bengal.

Status
William Harry Evans (1932) records the orange-tail awl as rare in India and very rare in the Andaman islands. He records the butterfly as not rare in south Myanmar, the Malay Peninsula and parts of the Indonesian archipelago.

Description

Both sexes: The butterfly has a wingspan of 45 to 50 mm. Above, both sexes are an unblemished dark brown. The hindwings have an orange fringe. The abdomen is orange towards the rear. Below, the wings have white patches; the forewings having a large white central patch, and the hindwings having a broad pure white discal band.

The male has no brands.

Detailed description
Edward Yerbury Watson (1891) gives a detailed description as follows:

Taxonomy
The skipper has the following subspecies:
 B. sena sena (Moore, 1865) - Type locality: Bengal. Distribution: Sri Lanka, S.India - Burma, Thailand, Laos, Hainan, Andamans.
 B. sena uniformis Elwes & Edwards 1897 - Type locality: Java. Distribution: Burma, Thailand, Malay Peninsula, Borneo, Java, Kangean, Bali, Lombok, Bawean, Sumba, Sumbawa.
 B. sena palawan (Staudinger, 1889) - Type locality: Palawan. Distribution: Calamian Islands, Cebu, Homonhon, Leyte, Luzon, Marinduque, Mindanao, Negros, Palawan, Panay, Polillo, Sibutu, Sibuyan, Tawitawi.

Habits

This butterfly is diurnal. The male can be seen in the early mornings, basking on the top of leaves in forest glades and hilltops, chasing off intruders. The typical resting position of the orange-tail awl is the underside of the leaf. He does not mud-puddle or visit flowers. The female is usually found close to the host plants.

Life history
The larva has been recorded on Combretum latifolium and Combretum extensum in Kanara.
In the Andamans the larvae has been recorded on Hiptage benghalensis (Malpighiaceae).

Cited references

References
Print

Watson, E. Y. (1891) Hesperiidae indicae. Vest and Co. Madras.

Online

Brower, Andrew V. Z. and Warren, Andrew, (2007). Coeliadinae Evans 1937. Version 21 February 2007 (temporary). http://tolweb.org/Coeliadinae/12150/2007.02.21 in The Tree of Life Web Project, http://tolweb.org/

Bibasis
Butterflies of Singapore
Butterflies described in 1865
Butterflies of Asia
Taxa named by Frederic Moore